This is a list of the Regions of Vietnam by Human Development Index as of 2023 with data for the year 2021.

See also
 List of countries by Human Development Index
 List of administrative divisions of Vietnam by Human Development Index

References 

Vietnam
Vietnam
Economy of Vietnam